Apple in the Middle is a middle-grade novel written by Dawn Quigley, published August 2, 2018 by North Dakota State University Press.

Reception 
Apple in the Middle received a starred review from School Library Journal, as well as a positive review from the Montessori Family Council.

References

See also 

2018 children's books